Rayan Djedje (born 4 July 2001) is a French professional footballer who plays as a midfielder.

Personal life
Born in France, Djedje is of Ivorian descent.

Career statistics

References

2001 births
Living people
Footballers from Montpellier
French footballers
French sportspeople of Ivorian descent
Association football midfielders
FC Metz players
R.F.C. Seraing (1922) players
Championnat National 3 players
Championnat National 2 players
Challenger Pro League players
Belgian Pro League players
French expatriate footballers
French expatriate sportspeople in Belgium
Expatriate footballers in Belgium